Sivert Todal (13 September 1904 – 30 September 1988) was a Norwegian politician for the Liberal Party.

He was elected to the Norwegian Parliament from Møre og Romsdal in 1958, and was re-elected on one occasion.

Todal was born in Aure and was mayor of Aure municipality in the periods 1951–1955 and 1955–1957.

References

1904 births
1988 deaths
Liberal Party (Norway) politicians
Members of the Storting
20th-century Norwegian politicians
People from Aure, Norway